The South Russian Ovcharka or South Russian Shepherd Dog is breed of flock guardian dog developed in the Russian Empire and in the Soviet Union. It is thought to derive from cross-breeding between local dogs of the Russian steppes and long-haired shepherd dogs brought to the area from Spain with Merino sheep. These may have been similar in appearance to the present-day Gos d'Atura Catala.

History 

The South Russian Ovcharka is thought to derive from cross-breeding between local dogs of the Russian steppes and long-haired shepherd dogs brought to the area from Spain with Merino sheep. These may have been similar in appearance to the present-day Gos d'Atura Catala. A cross-bred dog of this type won a gold medal at the Exposition Universelle of 1867 in Paris.

The breed standard was approved early in the 1930s.

The Fédération Cynologique Internationale definitively accepted it on 30 September 1983 as the Yuzhnorusskaya Ovcharka or South Russian Shepherd Dog.

Characteristics 
The head is long and of wedge shape; the ears are pendent and triangular. The coat is long, coarse and thick. It may be solid white, grey or pale ivory; or white with  tinges of yellow, or white with patches of grey, pale ivory or wheat colour.

Ban

The dog is banned in Denmark.

References 

FCI breeds
Dog breeds originating in Ukraine
Livestock guardian dogs